Subligny may refer to the following places in France:

Subligny, Cher, a commune in the department of Cher
Subligny, Manche, a commune in the department of Manche
Subligny, Yonne, a commune in the department of Yonne